Philip Neil Hope (September 24, 1972 –  November 18, 2007), better known and credited as Neil Hope, was a Canadian actor who was best known for portraying Derek "Wheels" Wheeler on the CBC teen drama series Degrassi Junior High and Degrassi High from 1987 to 1991, and Robin "Griff" Griffiths in The Kids of Degrassi Street from 1985 to 1986. He also reprised the role of Wheels for two episodes of Degrassi: The Next Generation in 2001 and 2003. 

After Degrassi High concluded in 1991, Hope struggled financially and battled alcoholism, diabetes, and depression, and largely lost contact with his family. Described as a drifter, Hope would occasionally call or visit his family until two years before his death. He was found dead in a rooming house on November 25, 2007, with his family, ex-castmates, and the public unaware of his death until nearly five years later.

Biography

Early life (1972-1984) 
Hope was born on September 24, 1972 in Toronto, Ontario, Canada, the fourth son and fifth child of his family. His parents were alcoholics and had an unstable relationship which led to their separation. He and his siblings often moved back and forth from their mother to their father. Hope had a good relationship with his father, whom he felt was supportive and loved him and his siblings. Hope attended the Etobicoke School of the Arts.

Degrassi (1985-2003) 
Hope often watched television with his father and siblings for dinner, which led him to develop an interest in the behind-the-scenes aspects of television production. He took a television training course, paid for by his father, and had professional promotional photos taken of himself. Hope made his acting debut in The Kids of Degrassi Street episode "Martin Meets The Pirates". Hope told interviewers that television had been an escape from his problems, and being involved in the medium made that escape a reality. After portraying the character Griff in The Kids of Degrassi Street from 1985 to 1986, Hope starred as Derek "Wheels" Wheeler on the teen drama series Degrassi Junior High and Degrassi High from 1987 to 1991. He later reprised this role for two episodes of Degrassi: The Next Generation in 2001 and 2003.

The original Degrassi series were non-union productions, and its cast were no longer paid regularly when it ended in the early 1990s, even as the series continued to see success in re-runs and syndication in over 50 countries. At the time of his death, Hope's only income was via a disability cheque. According to Hope's ex-fiance Christina Boulard: "It made him so upset that they worked so hard on Degrassi and even years later, a whole new generation was watching it in reruns and the cast wasn't getting a dime". According to Dan Woods, who portrayed Mr. Raditch, Degrassi creators and showrunners Kit Hood and Linda Schuyler set up a fund for cast members to financially support their education or business ventures. However, Hope never returned to school.

Final years (2004-2007) 
Hope was described as a drifter in his later years. Cast members had lost touch with him in the years since the end of the series; when a reunion took place on the CBC TV series Jonovision, Hope was absent. When host Jonathan Torrens asked the cast about whether they were still in touch with Hope, all of them admitted they weren't. His family stated that he continued to call and visit occasionally up until 2005. His final public appearance was in the CTV documentary The Degrassi Story, hosted by co-star Stefan Brogren, who interviewed him in Windsor. Hope later moved to Hamilton, where he briefly stayed at a Salvation Army shelter in 2006. In early November 2007, Hope visited Cheapies Records & Tapes, a music store in Hamilton that he often frequented. He was wearing an eyepatch and was incoherent. Employee Scott Bell said that it was the last time he saw Hope.

Health and death 
Hope was the child of alcoholics and was vocal about his own struggles with drinking. He discussed his parents' alcoholism in an episode of the documentary series Degrassi Talks. Hope also made a documentary called The Darker Side about the children of alcoholic parents, which featured contributions from his co-stars Bill Parrott and Rebecca Haines. Hope's father died in 1987 from cirrhosis of the liver. In 1994, he was diagnosed with type 1 diabetes and was required to have four insulin injections a day. However, his failure to manage his diabetes, along with his continued drinking problems, aggravated his health issues, something which frustrated his family, who recalled that he would often suffer diabetic episodes when he visited them. He also experienced bouts of depressions.

On November 25, 2007, Hope was found dead by his landlord in a rooming house in Hamilton. According to the Toronto Star, Hope was dead for more than a week prior to his discovery, and multiple unused insulin vials were located around his room. Hope, who neither police nor coroner's office officials recognized, was buried, unclaimed, in an unmarked plot in March 2008. A friend of Hope's allegedly told employees at Cheapies of his death, but his family remained unaware. His mother died in 2010. His family would learn of Hope's death almost five years later, in January 2012, with his sister-in-law subsequently informing a Facebook fan page dedicated to him of the news. Media outlets began reporting the news on February 16, 2012. In 2017, co-star and friend Pat Mastroianni stated: "We had found out three months prior to it being released publicly (in 2012), and the family had asked for privacy for a few months just to allow them to absorb what had happened."

Reactions 
Though Mastroianni stated that they had been notified months before the news became public, it was reported in February 2012 that another co-star, Amanda Stepto, had notified Epitome Pictures, the company who produced Degrassi: The Next Generation and held the rights to all previous series, about rumours of his death circulating online.  

Stephen Stohn, Epitome's executive producer, tweeted that "the entire team is very emotional about his passing". Linda Schuyler, co-creator of the Degrassi franchise, said of Hope in a joint statement with Stohn that he had made an "important contribution" to the lives of the producers, cast members and fans of the show, further adding: "His life was not an easy one but the time he spent with us was a shining example of determination, hard work and hopeful optimism and he is sorely missed". In her 2022 memoir The Mother Of All Degrassi, Schuyler recalled: "I was gut-wrenched. I couldn’t move from the bed for the better part of a week.", and added: "My main goal for the Degrassi franchise was to reassure young people that they are not alone, yet, despite my professional intentions and the long-standing friendship that Neil and I shared, he’d died alone. I felt that I had failed him."  

Mastroianni recalled being shocked, but "not surprised, because I knew he had a lot of health issues and I know that he didn’t really take care of himself that way." He also recalled: "My fond memories of him were not on set, they were not during the filming. It was all the things we did off set, it was all the shenanigans we got up to when we were just hanging out. … We were best friends back in the day, and we did hang out a lot and we did have these little adventures together."  

Boulard later announced plans for a memorial service with co-star Amanda Stepto, to take place in May 2012.  Hope was later buried with a new gravestone at Woodland Cemetery located in Hamilton, Ontario.

Personal life 
Hope met Christina Boulard when the two both worked at the financial service Money Mart in 1998. His family described him as being at his most happy with Boulard, and he proposed to her in 2000. The two split amicably in 2001, at which point Hope had begun to drift again. Hope was a fan of the Toronto Maple Leafs and Warren Zevon.

Notes

References

Works cited

External links

1972 births
2007 deaths
Canadian male child actors
Canadian male television actors
Male actors from Hamilton, Ontario
Male actors from Toronto
People with type 1 diabetes